Daniela "Dana" Haralambie (born 14 August 1997) is a Romanian ski jumper who has competed at World Cup level since the 2012/13 season.

Career
Competing at the Junior World Championships in 2011, 2012, 2013, 2014, 2015, 2016 and 2017, her best placement was 4th in the normal hill at home ground in Rasnov, Romania in 2016.

Haralambie made her World Cup debut in November 2012 in Lillehammer. Finishing lowly for the first year, she collected her first World Cup points with 26th place in December 2013 in Hinterzarten. Mostly finishing around 25th–35th, she started the 2015–16 World Cup circuit with a 21st place in Lillehammer and stabilized around 20th–30th place. A new lifetime best was set in December 2016 in Nizhny Tagil, finishing 18th, and then one year later she ended 11th in Zao.

She made her World Championship debut in 2013, finishing lowly. She managed 29th place in 2017, 13th in 2019, and 26th in 2021, all in the normal hill. She finished 25th in the normal hill race at the 2018 Olympic Games.

References 

1997 births
Living people
Romanian female ski jumpers
Ski jumpers at the 2018 Winter Olympics
Ski jumpers at the 2022 Winter Olympics
Olympic ski jumpers of Romania
Sportspeople from Brașov